Melvin I. Urofsky is an American historian, and professor emeritus at Virginia Commonwealth University.

He received his B.A. from Columbia University in 1961 and doctorate in 1968. He also received his JD from the University of Virginia.
He teaches at American University and George Washington University Law School.

Works
Big Steel and the Wilson Administration: A Study in Business-Government Relations, Columbus, Ohio: Ohio University Press, 1969. 
The Supreme Court Justices: A Biographical Dictionary, London: Routledge, 1994. 
American Zionism from Herzl to the Holocaust, Lincoln Univ. of Nebraska Press, 1995. 
Louis D. Brandeis: A Life,	New York: Pantheon Books, 2009. 
Dissent and the Supreme Court: Its Role in the Court's History and the Nation's Constitutional Dialogue, New York: Pantheon Books, 2015. 
The Affirmative Action Puzzle: A Living History from Reconstruction to Today, Pantheon 2020,

References

External links
 https://www.c-span.org/person/?melvinurofsky
https://www.neh.gov/humanities/2010/januaryfebruary/iq/impertinent-questions-melvin-i-urofsky

Columbia College (New York) alumni
University of Virginia School of Law alumni
Living people
Year of birth missing (living people)

Virginia Commonwealth University faculty
American University faculty and staff
Columbia Graduate School of Arts and Sciences alumni